

Netherton  is a locality in the Australian state of South Australia located about  south-east of the state capital of Adelaide and about  south-east of the municipal seat in Tailem Bend.

Netherton ’s boundaries were created on 24 August 2000 and given the “local established name” which is derived from the maiden name of the wife of Mr. J. Cattle, an early landowner in the cadastral unit of the Hundred of Peake.  Netherton was first used as the name of a post office located on section 34 of the Hundred of Peake and which operated from 15 January 1915 to 31 October 1969.  It is located on land at the junction of the hundred of Peake in the north, Livingston in the west and Carcuma in the east.

Land use within the locality is ’primary production’.

The 2016 Australian census which was conducted in August 2016 reports that Netherton had 40 people living within its boundaries.

Netherton is located within the federal division of Barker, the state electoral district of Hammond and the local government area of the Coorong District Council.

References

Towns in South Australia